Sky Atlantic is a German-language pay-TV station specializing in the broadcasting of HBO productions and therefore has the slogan "The Home of HBO".

History
The pay-TV station started its broadcast in HD on 23 May 2012 at 9 pm and was free of charge for three weeks for all Sky subscribers. For the regular reception, the "Sky Entertainment" package and optionally the HD channels must be subscribed. A SD version was started on December 3, 2013. Since 5 November 2015, a one-hour timeshift of Sky Atlantic is also available in HD.

The best audience, with 0.48 million viewers, scored the channel with the premiere of the seventh season of the series Game of Thrones on 17 July 2017.

The timeshift channel Sky Atlantic+1 was switched off on 11 September 2017. The service was replaced by the timeshift service Sky1+1 on 22 September 2017.

Programming

100 Code (2015-2016)
American Crime Story (2017–present)
Angry Boys (2013–present)
Animals. (2016–present)
Ballers (2015–2016)
Barry (2018–present)
Big Little Lies (2017–present)
Britannia (2018–present)
Fortitude (Fortitude - Ein Ort wie kein anderer) (2015–present)
Game of Thrones (Game of Thrones - Das Lied von Eis und Feuer) (2012–present)
Grey's Anatomy (Grey's Anatomy - Die jungen Ärzte) (2017–present)
Happyish (2016–present)
Here and Now (2018–present)
House of Cards (2013–present)
I'm Dying Up Here (2017–present)
Insecure (2017–present)
La peste (Die Pest) (2018–present)
Madam Secretary (2018–present)
Mosaic (2018–present)
Olive Kitteridge (2015–present)
Patrick Melrose (2018–present)
Peaky Blinders (Peaky Blinders - Gangs of Birmingham) (2014–present)
Polyamory: Married & Dating (Polyamorie - Liebe zu dritt) (2018–present)
Prófugos (Prófugos - Auf der Flucht) (2015–present)
Ray Donovan (2017–present)
Rectify (2013–present)
Riviera (2017–present)
Room 104 (2017–present)
Save Me (2018–present)
Saving My Tomorrow (2015–present)
Sharp Objects (2018–present)
Shooter (2017–present)
Silicon Valley (2015–present)
SMILF (2017–present)
Strike (2018–present)
The Casual Vacancy (The Casual Vacancy - Ein plötzlicher Todesfall) (2015–present)
The Deuce (2017–present)
The Night Of (The Night Of - Die Wahrheit einer Nacht) (2016–present)
The Putin Interviews (2017–present)
Thronecast (2015)
Tin Star (2017–present)
Versailles (2016–present)
Wentworth (2017–present)
Westworld (2016–present)
White Famous (2017–present)
Who Is America? (2018–present)

References

External links
 

Sky Deutschland
Sky television channels
German-language television stations
Television channels and stations established in 2012
Television stations in Germany
Television stations in Austria
Mass media in Munich